Podomachla acraeina is a moth of the family Erebidae first described by Herbert Druce in 1882. It is found in Cameroon, Equatorial Guinea, Ghana, Nigeria, Sierra Leone and Togo.

Subspecies
Podomachla acraeina acraeina
Podomachla acraeina togoensis (Strand, 1909) (Togo)

References

Nyctemerina
Moths described in 1882